Tek Chand is an Indian Paralympic shot putter and javelin thrower. He was born in the Rewari district of Haryana, and was disabled due to a road accident. He represented India in the 2020 Paralympic Games held in Tokyo in the men's shot-put F55 category. He was made the flag-bearer of the Indian contingent at the opening ceremony, replacing the quarantined Mariyappan Thangavelu. He finished last out of eight competitiors in the event, managing a best of 9.04 metres. He was originally listed for the men's F54 javelin, but later relisted. He has won the bronze medal in the 2018 Asian Para games.

References

External links 

 Tek Chand at paralympic.org

Indian male shot putters
Indian male javelin throwers
Paralympic athletes of India
Athletes (track and field) at the 2020 Summer Paralympics
Year of birth missing (living people)
Paralympic shot putters
Paralympic javelin throwers
Wheelchair shot putters
Wheelchair javelin throwers
Living people